Some of the most important explorations of State Societies, in chronological order:

See also
 Age of Discovery
 Exploration of Australia
 List of lost expeditions
 List of Russian explorers
 Exploration of the High Alps
 Portugal in the period of discoveries
 Chronology of European exploration of Asia

Explorations
Explorations

bs:Istraživanja
de:Entdeckungsreise
es:Cronología de las exploraciones
hr:Zemljopisna otkrića